Oddesund Bridge is a road and railway bascule bridge that crosses the Oddesund strait between the peninsulas of Jutland and Thyholm in Denmark.
It connects mainland Jutland with the historical region of Thy. It is on the Thy railway line between Struer and Thisted.

See also
List of bridges in Denmark
List of bridges
Sallingsund Bridge

Bridges in Denmark
Arch bridges in Denmark
Bascule bridges
Road bridges in Denmark
Railway bridges in Denmark
Road-rail bridges
Bridges completed in 1938
1938 establishments in Denmark
Limfjord